Dolenji Lazi is a settlement north of Ribnica in southern Slovenia. The railway line from Ljubljana to Kočevje runs through the settlement. The area is part of the traditional region of Lower Carniola and is now included in the Southeast Slovenia Statistical Region.

Name
The name Dolenji Lazi means 'lower clearings', contrasting with nearby Gorenji Lazi (literally, 'upper clearings'), which lies about  higher in elevation. The name refers to land that was cleared for settlement.

References

External links
Dolenji Lazi on Geopedia

Populated places in the Municipality of Ribnica